Hazreti Süleyman Mosque is a mosque in Diyarbakır, Turkey.

The mostly ashlar structure was built between 1155 and 1169 by Nisanoğlu Ebul Kasim. The mosque is divided into three sections and has a square-based minaret, which has an inscription dated to 555 AH (1160 CE) according to the Islamic calendar. It contains the tombs of Süleyman, son of Khalid ibn al-Walid of the Bekir clan and his followers. The mosque was brought to its current state in 1631 by Silahdar Murtaza Pasha.

References

Mosques in Diyarbakır
Religious buildings and structures completed in 1169
12th-century mosques